Touré (born Touré Neblett; March 20, 1971) is an American writer, music journalist, cultural critic, podcaster, and television personality. He was a co-host of the TV show The Cycle on MSNBC. He was also a contributor to MSNBC's The Dylan Ratigan Show, and the host of Fuse's Hiphop Shop and On the Record. He serves on the Rock and Roll Hall of Fame Nominating Committee. He taught a course on the history of hip hop at the Clive Davis Institute of Recorded Music, part of the Tisch School of the Arts in New York.

Touré is the author of several books, including The Portable Promised Land (2003), Soul City (2005), Who's Afraid of Post-Blackness? What It Means To Be Black Now (2011) and I Would Die 4 U: Why Prince Became an Icon (2013). He is also a frequent contributor at The Daily Beast.

Early life
Touré was born Touré Neblett in Boston on March 20, 1971. His father, Roy E. Neblett, was an accountant and a member of the personal staff of Boston mayor Kevin White. Touré's parents met while Roy was studying at Suffolk University Law School, and his mother Patricia also worked at the Neblett accounting firm. Touré's paternal grandparents were immigrants to Harlem from Barbados and the British Virgin Islands.

He attended Milton Academy, and then Emory University but dropped out after his junior year. In 1996, he attended Columbia University's MFA writing program for one year. His sister Meika also attended Milton Academy and Emory, where she completed her degree in three and a half years and competed in the NCAA Division I Women's Tennis Championship as a freshman, before attending Howard University College of Medicine.

Career

Writing career
While a student at Emory University, Touré founded a black student newspaper, The Fire This Time. Touré began his writing career as an intern at Rolling Stone in 1992. He has contributed essays and articles to Rolling Stone, Essence, The New Yorker, The New York Times, Playboy, Time, The Village Voice, Vibe, The Washington Post and Ebony.  His Rolling Stone article, "Kurt is My Co-Pilot," about Dale Earnhardt Jr. was included in The Best American Sports Writing 2001. His writing has also been featured in the collections Best American Essays of 1999, the Da Capo Best Music Writing of 2004 and Best American Erotica of 2004.

Touré has written five books. In 2002, his short story collection Portable Promised Land was published. He also wrote a novel, Soul City (2004), set in an African-American utopia, according to The Washington Post. His 2006 essay collection, Never Drank the Kool-Aid, included the personal essay, "What's Inside You, Brother?", which was considered for inclusion in Houghton Mifflin Harcourt's Best American Essays of 1996. In 2012, Touré published Who's Afraid of Post-Blackness?: What it Means to be Black Now, a book on race in modern America based on a collection of interviews Touré conducted with over 100 prominent African-American icons. Who’s Afraid of Post-Blackness? was named one of the most influential books of 2011 by both The New York Times and The Washington Post, and the book earned Touré a nomination for an NAACP Image Award for Outstanding Literary Work in Non-Fiction. In 2013, Touré published I Would Die 4 U: Why Prince Became an Icon, a biography of Prince that discusses the pop artist's works and legacy in a religious context. The book is based on a series of lectures Touré delivered at Harvard University in 2012.

Television

In 2002, Touré appeared opposite Paula Zahn on CNN's American Morning and was later featured three times a week on a panel called "90-Second Pop." He was subsequently hired as CNN's first pop culture correspondent. In 2005, BET hired Touré to cover BET News and Public Affairs programming.

He also hosted the series Community Surface on Tennis Channel and MTV's Spoke N' Heard, and was interviewed on the life of Eminem for the rapper's A&E Biography episode. In 2008, he hosted the reality show I'll Try Anything Once, in which he tried a variety of jobs and activities, including rodeo clowning and lumberjacking.

From June 25, 2012, to July 31, 2015, he co-hosted The Cycle on MSNBC with former congressional candidate Krystal Ball, moderate Republican Abby Huntsman, and The Nation correspondent Ari Melber. The Cycle'''s key demographic was initially made up of Generation X viewers, and its success in this age bracket was attributed to the engaging personalities of its unusually young hosts. Touré often introduced race theory into political discussion on the show. On July 24, 2015, media outlets reported that MSNBC was restructuring its television lineup to eliminate shows such as The Cycle due to disappointingly low ratings. MSNBC confirmed the cancellation on July 30.

Touré criticized and debated with Piers Morgan over the latter's March 2012 interview with George Zimmerman's brother, particularly over what Touré saw as Morgan's lack of response to Robert Zimmerman's problematic replies.

In August 2012, as part of a discussion on The Cycle, Touré claimed Republican presidential nominee Mitt Romney had engaged in racial coding by calling President Barack Obama "angry," and referred to this as "niggerization." Touré apologized for using the word the next day.

In May 2014, Touré drew criticism from the Simon Wiesenthal Center for implying Holocaust survivors succeeded in the U.S. after the Second World War because they were white: a blogger from the website Yo, Dat's Racis'!! tweeted at Touré, "My family survived a concentration camp, came to the US w/ nothing, LEGALLY, and made it work" to which Touré replied, "the power of whiteness." Touré later apologized for his comment, saying, "In an attempt to comment on racism in post World War II America, I used a shorthand that was insensitive and wrong."Ross, L.A. (May 27, 2014). "MSNBC Host Apologizes for 'Power of Whiteness' Tweet About Holocaust". TheWrap; retrieved March 19, 2015.

Podcasting
Touré hosts several podcasts, including Touré Show, democracy-ish, and Free MFA with Touré. He is known for exploring Black identity and the concept of post-blackness.Touré Show is a weekly African American podcast hosted by Touré and produced by DCP Entertainment. The podcast features Black actors, musicians, politicians, athletes, activists, and other people of color and their allies. Guests discuss their rise to success and offer practical advice for listeners about achieving goals. Among those he has interviewed include rapper Princess Nokia, comedian Roy Wood Jr., and astrophysicist Neil deGrasse Tyson. Touré Show has received largely positive listener reviews on chartable.com, a podcast measurement company.Democracy-ish is a weekly podcast hosted by Touré alongside co-host Danielle Moodie, and is produced by DCP Entertainment. The podcast provides weekly rundowns of the 2020 presidential election from a Black progressive point of view. Touré and co-host Danielle Moodie also cover current events not related to the election affecting Black Americans on the show. Democracy-ish podcast has received largely positive listener reviews on chartable.com.

Touré hosted eight episodes of the weekly podcast, Free MFA with Touré.  Touré offered his insights on writing and highlighted key lessons he learned from his MFA program.

Touré has also made guest appearances on podcasts including Creative Rebels, OPP with Corey Cambridge, Honestly Speaking with Tara Setmayer, and The Gist''.

Sexual harassment accusation
On January 11, 2019, Touré was accused of workplace sexual harassment by a makeup artist who had worked with him in 2017. Touré publicly apologized for his behavior, saying, "On the show, our team, including myself, engaged in edgy, crass banter, that at the time I did not think was offensive for our tight-knit group. I am sorry for my language and for making her feel uncomfortable in any way. As a lead on the show, I should have refrained from this behavior. I have learned and grown from this experience."

Personal life
On March 19, 2005, Touré married Lebanese American novelist and pop culture commentator Rita Nakouzi. They have a son named Hendrix and a daughter named Fairuz.  Rev. Run from Run-DMC was the officiant, and Nelson George served as the best man. Touré and his wife live in the Fort Greene neighborhood of Brooklyn, New York.

Bibliography

References

External links

Touré on Twitter
Touré on Facebook
Touré on Typepad blog
The Career Cookbook Touré profile

1971 births
21st-century American essayists
21st-century American novelists
21st-century American short story writers
African-American novelists
American Book Award winners
American male essayists
American male journalists
American male novelists
American music critics
American male short story writers
Columbia University School of the Arts alumni
Emory University alumni
Journalists from New York City
Living people
Milton Academy alumni
MSNBC people
Novelists from Massachusetts
Novelists from New York (state)
People from Fort Greene, Brooklyn
Writers from Boston
Writers from Brooklyn
21st-century American male writers